Elections to Weymouth and Portland Borough Council were held on 1 May 2003.  One third of the council was up for election and the council stayed under no overall control.

After the election, the composition of the council was
Labour 13
Liberal Democrat 11
Conservative 6
Independent 5

Election result

Ward results

References
2003 Weymouth and Portland election result
Ward results 

2003
2003 English local elections
2000s in Dorset